Sir Arthur Abraham Gold (January 10, 1917 – May 25, 2001) was a British sports administrator.

Biography
Arthur Gold was born on January 10, 1917, in a Jewish family, to Mark and Leah Gold. He studied at the Grocers' Company School. Later, he attended the Loughborough Summer School at the age of 17. As a player, he represented the United Kingdom on the tours of Finland and Norway in 1937 at high jump.

In 1974, he was appointed CBE.

Between 1979 and 1990, Gold was chairman of the Commonwealth Games Council.

From 1984 to 1992, he was the head of the British Olympic Association and later as its vice president. Before joining the British Olympic Association, he was knighted in 1984.

Gold also held the position of the European Athletics Association for life time.

In 1991, he received Olympic Order (silver) for his services.

References

1917 births
2001 deaths
British sports executives and administrators
British people of Jewish descent
International Jewish Sports Hall of Fame inductees